Claudette Johanne Woodard (April 21, 1945 – February 26, 2010) was a former Democratic member of the Ohio House of Representatives, representing the 9th District from 2001 to 2006.

She died in 2010, aged 64. She had vascular dementia.

References

External links
Page on the Ohio House of Representatives website
Profile on the Ohio Ladies' Gallery website

2010 deaths
Democratic Party members of the Ohio House of Representatives
Women state legislators in Ohio
1945 births
21st-century American politicians
21st-century American women politicians
Deaths from vascular dementia